The Muskogee Phoenix is a daily newspaper published in Muskogee, Oklahoma, United States, covering several counties of northeastern Oklahoma. It is owned by Community Newspaper Holdings Inc.  The paper is printed five days a week (Tuesday-Saturday), while digital access is available 7 days a week.

The Phoenix was founded in February 1888, when Oklahoma was still a territory.

From 1980 through 1986, Marjorie Paxson was publisher.

References

External links
 Muskogee Phoenix Website
 CNHI Website

Newspapers published in Oklahoma
Muskogee, Oklahoma